St. John's Church is a church located in the Norrmalm district of Stockholm, Sweden. It was designed by Carl Möller in the Gothic Revival style and completed in 1890.

See also
 List of churches in Stockholm

References

External links 

 

19th-century Church of Sweden church buildings
Churches in Stockholm
Churches in the Diocese of Stockholm (Church of Sweden)
Churches completed in 1890
Gothic Revival church buildings in Sweden